The Coburn Classical Institute was a college preparatory school in Waterville, Maine, which operated from 1828–1970.

Waterville Academy
In its early years, Waterville College (now Colby College) had maintained a Latin school in the college buildings.  Around 1828, the college trustees wanted a classical academy to prepare boys for entrance to the college.  Land was donated by Hon. Timothy Boutelle, and funds raised by the college president Jeremiah Chaplin, for a small brick building in which the school went into operation in the fall of 1829.  The school was under the charge of Henry W. Paine, then a member of the senior class at the college.  Regarded as an appendage to the college, no act of incorporation was sought.  There were 61 students in the school's first year.

For about two years, 1839 and 1840, Waterville Academy was closed.  The school re-opened in 1841, and in 1842 the trustees of Waterville College incorporated the school separately and passed control to a new board of trustees.  Girls were admitted to the school beginning in 1845, and in 1865, the school was renamed the Waterville Classical Institute.

Waterville Classical Institute
In 1868, a Bachelor of Letters degree was first awarded to women.  Around 1874, Abner Coburn pledged $50,000 to the endowment of the school, on the condition that $50,000 also be raised to support two other institutes proposed by the college (called at the time Colby University).  In 1882, Coburn erected a new building for school at an additional expense of $38,000, and the school got its final name — Coburn Classical Institute.

Coburn Classical Institute
An observatory dome was added to the school in 1889, with an Alvan Clark & Sons equatorial telescope.

Modern
In 1970 the school merged with the Oak Grove School in Vassalboro, Maine, which was renamed the Oak Grove Coburn School and closed in 1989. In 1990, the State of Maine purchased the Vassalboro campus and turned it into the State of Maine Criminal Justice Academy, a police academy which trains all law enforcement officers, state, county and municipal, who have the power of arrest and the authority to carry a firearm in the State of Maine.

People

Principals

Notable alumni
Obadiah Gardner
Asher Hinds
Edwin Francis Lyford
Marston Morse
Jane Maria Read
Clyde Sukeforth, enrolled 1916. Major and minor league baseball player, manager and scout, instrumental in getting Jackie Robinson in the league for manager Branch Rickey of the Brooklyn  Dodgers. Society for American Baseball Research.

Louise Helen Coburn, 1873 A.B.

Notable faculty
 Elijah Parish Lovejoy (Headmaster; 1824–1826)
 Ginger Fraser (Athletic director; 1919–1921)

References

Boarding schools in Maine
Schools in Kennebec County, Maine
Private high schools in Maine
Preparatory schools in Maine
Education in Waterville, Maine